The Animation Picture Company is an American animation studio in Sherman Oaks, California. It was founded in late 2006 by Dan Chuba, John Davis, Mark A.Z. Dippé, Brain Manis, and Ash Shah.

Filmography

Video Game productions

Animation productions

Special/VFX Effects productions

References

American animation studios
Companies based in Los Angeles
Mass media companies established in 2006
2006 establishments in California
Privately held companies based in California